Rudolf Toboła (21 May 1927 – 1987) was a Polish wrestler. He competed in the men's Greco-Roman bantamweight at the 1952 Summer Olympics.

References

1927 births
1987 deaths
Polish male sport wrestlers
Olympic wrestlers of Poland
Wrestlers at the 1952 Summer Olympics
Sportspeople from Somme (department)
French people of Polish descent